The 2012–13 Old Dominion Monarchs basketball team represented Old Dominion University during the 2012–13 NCAA Division I men's basketball season. The Monarchs, led by 12th year head coach Blaine Taylor, played their home games at Ted Constant Convocation Center and were members of the Colonial Athletic Association. This was their final season as a member of the CAA as they will join Conference USA in July 2013. As a result of the conference change, the Monarchs were not be eligible to participate in the 2013 CAA men's basketball tournament.

After a 2–20 start to the season, head coach Blaine Taylor was fired. Assistant coach Jim Corrigan was named the Monarchs interim head coach for the remainder of the season.

They finished the season 5–25, 3–15 in CAA play to finish in last place.

Roster

Schedule

|-
!colspan=9| Exhibition

|-
!colspan=9| Regular Season

References

Old Dominion Monarchs men's basketball seasons
Old Dominion
Old Dominion Monarchs basketball
Old Dominion Monarchs basketball